Johanna "Veronica" Abrahamse (born 18 March 1980) is a South African athlete specializing in the shot put. She won bronze medals at the 1998 and 2002 Commonwealth Games, as well as many medals on continental level. Her personal best put is 17.76 metres from 2002.

Competition record

References

External links
 

1980 births
Living people
South African female shot putters
Athletes (track and field) at the 1998 Commonwealth Games
Athletes (track and field) at the 2002 Commonwealth Games
Commonwealth Games bronze medallists for South Africa
Commonwealth Games medallists in athletics
African Games silver medalists for South Africa
African Games medalists in athletics (track and field)
African Games bronze medalists for South Africa
Athletes (track and field) at the 1999 All-Africa Games
Athletes (track and field) at the 2003 All-Africa Games
Athletes (track and field) at the 2007 All-Africa Games
Athletes (track and field) at the 2011 All-Africa Games
White South African people
Medallists at the 1998 Commonwealth Games
Medallists at the 2002 Commonwealth Games